Jarocin may refer to the following places:
Jarocin in Greater Poland Voivodeship (west-central Poland)
Jarocin, Masovian Voivodeship (east-central Poland)
Jarocin, Subcarpathian Voivodeship (south-east Poland)
Jarocin, Warmian-Masurian Voivodeship (north Poland)

See also
 Gmina Jarocin (disambiguation)